The 2016 National Pro Fastpitch season was the 13th season of professional softball under the name National Pro Fastpitch (NPF) for the only professional women's softball league in the United States.  From 1997 to 2002, NPF operated under the names Women's Pro Fastpitch (WPF) and Women's Pro Softball League (WPSL). Each year, the playoff teams battle for the Cowles Cup.

Milestones and events

The Akron Racers celebrated their 15th season in 2016, the most of any NPF team.  They have played in all 13 of the NPF's seasons, as well at the WPSL's last two seasons (1999 and 2000).

On October 23, 2015, the NPF announced that the Scrap Yard Dawgs would join the league as an expansion team.

On April 11, NPF announced a renewal of their television agreement with CBS Sports Network for 2016.  Broadcasts will include the 2016 NPF College Draft, 23 regular-season games, a Championship Series Preview Special, and most of the Championship Series.

On June 10, the Pride's Chelsea Thomas and Kelsey Nunley pitched a combined no-hitter against the Dawgs at the Scrap Yard's 
first-ever home game.

On August 11, Lauren Haeger pitched a no-hitter, beating the Chicago Bandits 5–0.  The only Bandit to reach base did so via a Charge fielding error.

Rawlings announced it would begin awarding a fastpitch softball gold glove to an NPF player, selected by a vote of league coaches and managers.  The Racers' AJ Andrews was selected for this award.

Kelly Kretschman became the first NPF player to win the triple crown when she ended the season leading in batting average, home runs, and RBI.

Rule changes
On June 12, in response to online threats made against players, NPF cancelled the mandatory 45-minute autograph session after each game.  The following Tuesday, the league reinstated the sessions, but limited the attendees to children.

Teams, cities and stadiums

Player acquisition

College draft

The 2016 NPF College Draft is the 13th annual collegiate draft for NPF, and was held on Thursday, April 14, 2016, 7:00 pm CST at the CMA Theater in the Country Music Hall of Fame and Museum in Nashville, Tennessee.

With the first overall pick, the Pennsylvania Rebellion selected Louisiana-Lafayette catcher Lexie Elkins, who led the NCAA during the 2015–16 season in batting average, slugging percentage and home runs and was also tied for 13th in Division I history with 72 career home runs.

Notable transactions

Head Coaching Changes
 Dallas Charge hired University of Florida assistant coach Jennifer Rocha to be their new head coach,
 Florida State head coach Lonni Alameda took over as head coach of the USSSA Pride. 
 On October 27, 2015, Stacey Porter, called "the world’s best batter,” signed a contract with the Pennsylvania Rebellion.
 On May 5, the Scrap Yard Dawgs signed free agent Monica Abbott to a six-year contract, believed to be worth $1 million.  No woman had previously signed a million-dollar contract in American professional team sports.

League standings 
Through 2016 Season  

x-Clinched Playoff Berth
y-Clinched Best Overall Record

Final two games between Scrap Yard Dawgs and Chicago cancelled as there was no playoff implications

Results table

NPF Championship
The 2016 NPF Championship was held at Rhoads Stadium on the campus of the University of Alabama in Tuscaloosa, Alabama, from August 19–23.

Championship Game

Statistical leaders 
Through 8/14/16 Source:

League Leaders Summary as of August 14, 2016 (All games)

Players of the Week

Annual awards
The 2016 NPF Award Banquet was held August 18 at Embassy Suites in Tuscaloosa.  In addition to the usual state of annual awards, Kelly Kretschman received a special award for being the first NPF player to win the Triple Crown (lead the league in batting average. home runs, and RBI).  NPF also awarded Appreciation Awards to Larry Brushett, softball representative form Mizuno, and Dina Kwit, Chicago Bandits photographer.  Rawling presented a Gold Glove to a female athlete, A.J. Andrews of the Akron Racers, for the first time as well.

Notes

All-NPF Team

See also 

 List of professional sports leagues
 List of professional sports teams in the United States and Canada

References

External links 
 

Softball teams
Softball in the United States
2016 in women's softball
2016 in American women's sports